The Government of the 3rd Dáil was first both concurrently the 2nd Provisional Government (30 August – 6 December 1922) and the 5th Ministry of Dáil Éireann (9 September – 6 December 1922), formed after the 1922 general election held on 16 June 1922, and then the 1st Executive Council of the Irish Free State (6 December 1922 – 19 September 1923), formed after the establishment of the Irish Free State. They were led by W. T. Cosgrave, who had become the leader of the Pro-Treaty wing of Sinn Féin and on 27 April 1923 became the first leader of the Cumann na nGaedheal.

The 2nd Provisional Government and the 5th Ministry lasted for overlapping concurrent periods of  days and  days respectively. The 1st Executive Council lasted for  days.

2nd Provisional Government and 5th Ministry

The 2nd Provisional Government (30 August 1922 – 6 December 1922) was formed by W. T. Cosgrave, who had been appointed as Chairman of the Provisional Government on 25 August 1922, after the death of Michael Collins on 22 August, who had led the 1st Provisional Government from 16 January 1922.

Arthur Griffith, the President of the Dáil who had led the 4th Ministry from 10 January 1922, had died on 12 August. The members of the 3rd Dáil first met on 9 September 1922. W. T. Cosgrave was proposed as President of the Dáil by Richard Mulcahy and seconded by Eoin MacNeill. This motion was carried and Cosgrave and formed the 5th Ministry (9 September 1922 – 6 December 1922), composed of Pro-Treaty members of Sinn Féin and identical in composition to the 2nd Provisional Government. With these appointments, the dual cabinets which had existed from January 1922 came to an end, with Cosgrave serving as both Chairman of the Provisional Government and President of Dáil Éireann. Both cabinets were abolished when the new Constitution of the Irish Free State came into force on 6 December 1922.

1st Executive Council of the Irish Free State

The 1st Executive Council of the Irish Free State (6 December 1922 – 19 September 1923) was formed by Pro-Treaty faction of Sinn Féin, which became Cumann na nGaedheal in April 1923. On 6 December 1922, the Constitution of the Irish Free State came into force. William T. Cosgrave was proposed as President of the Executive Council by Peter Hughes and seconded by Francis McGuinness, and this motion was approved by the Dáil.

The President nominated the members of the Executive Council on 6 December.

Ministers not members of the Executive Council
The following Ministers were proposed by a committee of the Dáil on 14 December 1922.

Parliamentary Secretaries
The Executive Council appointed the following Parliamentary Secretaries. These were newly created offices.

See also
Dáil Éireann
Dáil Éireann (Irish Republic)
Dáil Éireann (Irish Free State)
Government of Ireland
Politics of the Republic of Ireland

References

Ministries of George V
3rd Dáil
Government 03
Governments of the Irish Free State
1922 establishments in Ireland
1923 disestablishments in Ireland
Cabinets established in 1922
Cabinets disestablished in 1923
Minority governments